Mademoiselle de Longueville was the name prior to marriage of the following:
 Françoise d'Orléans-Longueville (1549–1601), second wife of Louis de Bourbon, Prince of Condé
 Marie de Nemours (1625–1707), Duchess of Nemours and Princess of Neuchâtel